CCJSHS may refer to:
 Coahoma County Junior-Senior High School
 Crescent City High School (or Crescent City Junior-Senior High School)